Kang-i Sun Chang (born Sun K'ang-i, ; 21 February 1944), is a Chinese-born American sinologist. She is a scholar of classical Chinese literature. She is the inaugural Malcolm G. Chace Professor, and former chair of the Department of East Asian Languages and Literatures at Yale University.

Early life and education
Sun K'ang-i was born on 21 February 1944 in Beijing. Her father Sun Yü-kuang (孫裕光) was from Tianjin, and her mother Ch'en Yü-chen (陳玉真) was born in Kaohsiung, Taiwan. The couple met when they were both studying in Japan, and they later moved to Beijing, where Sun taught at Peking University.

In 1946, Peking University was unable to pay its employees due to hyperinflation. Influenced by his close friend  (張我軍), later a leading literary figure and the father of archaeologist Kwang-chih Chang, Sun Yü-kuang decided to follow Chang and move to Taiwan; Kang-i was two years old at the time.

In 1950, Sun was arrested by the Kuomintang (Nationalists) during the White Terror period of Taiwan, and imprisoned for ten years. Kang-i was six years old at the time of her father's arrest. According to her own account, she was traumatized by the event and suddenly lost the ability to speak Mandarin within a few days. From then on, she was only able to speak Taiwanese, and had to relearn Mandarin in school. Throughout her school years she was often laughed at for speaking Mandarin with a heavy Taiwanese accent.

After high school, Sun Kang-i chose to study at Tunghai University instead of the more prestigious National Taiwan University (NTU) because Tunghai's English professors were all Americans. She graduated from Tunghai in 1966 with a B.A. in English literature and a minor in Chinese literature. She then studied for two years at the graduate school of NTU.

In 1968, she moved to the United States, where she studied at Rutgers University in New Jersey, earning a master's degree in library science in 1971. She then enrolled at South Dakota State University, where her husband was a faculty member, receiving an M.A. in English literature in 1972. She was mainly interested in English literature while growing up in Taiwan, and only became truly interested in Chinese literature after moving to the United States. Chang subsequently entered Princeton University, earning her M.A. in classical Chinese literature in 1976, and Ph.D. in 1978, with a minor in comparative literature. Her advisors were Yu-kung Kao, Andrew H. Plaks, F. W. Mote, Earl Miner, and Ralph Freedman.

Career
Chang returned to mainland China for the first time in 1979, and learned that while her father was imprisoned by the Kuomintang in Taiwan, her grandfather Sun Lisheng (孫勵生), who had remained in China, was persecuted by the Communists for his Taiwanese connection, and committed suicide in 1953.

From 1979 to 1980, Chang was a visiting assistant professor of Chinese literature at Tufts University. She then worked as curator of the Gest Library and East Asian Collections at Princeton University. She began teaching at Yale University in July 1982, becoming a tenured associate professor in 1986, and full professor in 1990. She served as chairperson of the Department of East Asian Languages and Literatures from 1991 to 1997, and director of graduate studies for many years.

Inspired by Kwang-chih Chang's autobiography, Kang-i Sun Chang published her own memoir Farewell to the White Terror in 2003. A second edition was published in 2013 under the title Journey Through the White Terror: A Daughter’s Memoir.

In 2004, Cambridge University Press invited Chang to be the chief editor of The Cambridge History of Chinese Literature. She declined the job at first, but later changed her mind, and invited Stephen Owen of Harvard University as co-editor. The two-volume work was published in 2010.

Recognition
In 2015, Chang was inducted into American Academy of Arts and Sciences (AAAS) as a lifelong Fellow.

In 2016, Chang was elected as one of the 20 new Academicians of Academia Sinica.

Publications
 The Evolution of Chinese Tz'u Poetry: From Late T'ang to Northern Sung (Princeton University Press, 1980).
 Six Dynasties Poetry (Princeton University Press, 1986).
 The Late-Ming Poet Ch'en Tzu-lung: Crises of Love and Loyalism (Yale University Press, 1991).
 Writing Women in Late Imperial China (Stanford University Press, 1997).
 Feminists Readings: Classical and Modern Perspectives (Taipei: Lianhe wenxu, 1998)
 Women Writers of Traditional China: An Anthology of Poetry and Criticism, with Haun Saussy and Charles Yim-tze Kwong, eds. (Stanford University Press, 1999).
 Voices of Literature (Taipei: Sanman, 2001).
 Challenges of the Literary Canon (Jiangxi: Baihuazhou wenyi Press, 2002).
 Farewell to the White Terror (Taipei: Asian Culture Press, 2003).
 The Evolution of Chinese Tz'u Poetry (Peking University Press, 2004).
 My Thoughts on the American Spirit (Taipei: Jiuge Publishing House, 2006).
 Tradition and Modernity: Comparative Perspectives, with Meng Hua, eds. (Peking University Press, 2007).
 Calligraphy of Ch'ung-ho Chang Frankel: Selected Inscriptions (Oxford University Press, 2009).
 Experiencing Yale (Beijing: Fenghuang Publishing House, 2009).
 Artistic and Cultural Traditions of the Kunqu Musicians (Guangxi Normal University Press, 2010).
 Quren Hongzhao, with Ch'ung-ho Chang Frankel. (Taipei: Lianjing Publishing House, 2010)
 The Cambridge History of Chinese Literature with Stephen Owen, eds. (Cambridge University Press, 2010).
 Journey Through the White Terror, 2nd edition (National Taiwan University Press, 2013).
 Modern Perspectives on Classical Chinese Literature (Yiwen Publishing House, 2013).
Source:

See also
Chia-ying Yeh

References

1944 births
Living people
American sinologists
American women academics
American women writers of Chinese descent
Members of Academia Sinica
National Taiwan University alumni
Princeton University alumni
Rutgers University alumni
South Dakota State University alumni
Taiwanese emigrants to the United States
Chinese emigrants to Taiwan
Tufts University faculty
Tunghai University alumni
Women orientalists
Writers from Beijing
Yale University faculty
21st-century American women